Richard Charles Hillman is a fictional character from the British ITV soap opera Coronation Street, played by Brian Capron. He first appeared on 20 June 2001 and became the show's main antagonist until his eventual departure on 14 March 2003.

The character's story arc began with Richard appearing in Weatherfield for the funeral of his late cousin, Alma Baldwin (Amanda Barrie). He befriended Alma's closest friend, Gail Platt (Helen Worth), and they started a relationship which culminated in them marrying a year later, on 28 July 2002. From that point, however, it had already transpired that Richard secretly withholds both a homicidal streak and an ongoing financial crisis during the time he occasionally played happy families with Gail along with her two children Sarah-Louise (Tina O'Brien) and David (Jack P. Shepherd).

In the course of events surrounding Richard's plight to avoid financial bankruptcy and allow his property company called "Kellet Holdings" to remain afloat, he ended up leaving his business partner Duggie Ferguson (John Bowe) to die after the latter ends up having a fatal accident; murdering his ex-wife Patricia (Annabelle Apsion) with a shovel when she attempts to expose his fraudulent dealings; clashing with Gail's ex-husband Martin (Sean Wilson) on certain family occasions; forming a subsequent entrepreneurship with fellow businessman Steve McDonald (Simon Gregson); swindling neighbours Jack Duckworth (Bill Tarmey) and his spouse Vera (Liz Dawn) from their life savings in an investment scam; kidnapping local gossip Norris Cole (Malcolm Hebden) to stop him from investigating the truth about Kellett Holdings and after he prevents his friend Rita Fairclough (Barbara Knox) from being conned as well; befriending Gail's eldest son Nick Tilsley (Adam Rickitt) when he gets invited to their wedding; attempting to bribe the street's Councillor Curly Watts (Kevin Kennedy) with the discovery that a Bail Hostel operation threatens to jeopardize his development plans; forcing Patricia's best-friend Charlotte Morris (Joanne Zorian) to leave Weatherfield after she threatens to uncover the true circumstances behind her fate; plotting to kill his mother-in-law Audrey Roberts (Sue Nicholls) by setting her house on fire, after which he exploits his failure to doing so with the conclusion that she has Alzheimer's disease; becoming enemies with Audrey's companion Archie Shuttleworth (Roy Hudd) in light of setting fire to her house; killing Audrey's co-worker Maxine Peacock (Tracy Shaw) with a crowbar after using it to unsuccessfully murder Norris' roommate Emily Bishop (Eileen Derbyshire) as part of his plan to extract her house as a result of his equity release scheme that Emily signed with his company; and framing Sarah's troublesome ex-boyfriend Aiden Critchley (Dean Ashton) for the crime of both Emily's attack and Maxine's murder in retribution for Aidan causing an earlier car crash that nearly killed Sarah and left her hospitalized for a while.

Eventually, Richard confessed his crimes to Gail in a two-hander episode between them on 24 February 2003. He seemingly departed Weatherfield for good after Gail denounced their marriage and the extent of his illicit activities subsequently become public knowledge, but Richard returned weeks later with the intent on killing his stepfamily and himself. He abducted Gail and her children, along with Sarah's infant daughter Bethany, from their house and attempted to kill them all in their garage. However, after Audrey and Martin discovered his last-ditch familicide plan, Richard drove off with his captive stepfamily and ended up plunging their Ford Galaxy into a canal—but they survived while he drowned.

Since then, Richard has been rated as one of the best soap villains of all time and in the programme itself—alongside the likes of Alan Bradley (Mark Eden) and Pat Phelan (Connor McIntyre).

Storylines

Backstory
Before arriving in Coronation Street, Richard Hillman became a financial advisor and ended up getting married on two different occasions. He and his first wife Marian tried for many years to have a baby without success. When Richard's mother falls ill, Marian decides that she doesn't want to look after an old aged pensioner so she leaves Richard. During their separation, Marian dies. Sometime later, Richard's mother has died and Richard married his second wife - Patricia (Annabelle Apsion). Like Marian beforehand, Patricia wants children and she and Richard are shocked to discover that he is sterile. Knowing that Richard and Marian had tried unsuccessfully to have a child, Patricia believes that Richard has deceived her about his fertility though Richard later tells his third wife Gail Platt (Helen Worth) that he had always believed that Marian was at fault and was stunned to discover that he was responsible. Whatever the reason, Patricia and Richard divorce.

2001–2003
Richard Hillman makes his first appearance in Weatherfield when he attends the funeral of a local resident, Alma Baldwin (Amanda Barrie), in summer 2001 - claiming to be her cousin. He quickly befriends Alma's best friend Gail, and they gradually form a romantic relationship together. Richard moves in with her, winning over her children Sarah-Louise (Tina O'Brien) and David (Jack P. Shepherd) by buying them expensive gifts. He also forms an unlikely mutual friendship with Gail's ex-husband Martin Platt (Sean Wilson); they initially became hostile to each other after Richard shouts at David for going on his computer without permission, but the pair soon befriend each other as time goes on.

Richard's dealings are soon questioned after local shopkeeper Norris Cole (Malcolm Hebden) learns that Richard was responsible for several elderly people losing their savings. Richard sets up a business called Kellett Holdings, which specialises in buy-back mortgages — he would buy the house but the occupant was free to live there until their death. Richard also goes into business with the new Rovers Return landlord Duggie Ferguson (John Bowe), building an estate of new homes. Richard confronts Duggie at an under construction block of flats during a disagreement about Duggie's shoddy workmanship. During the argument, Duggie falls several floors when a banister gives way - ironically, due to his own shoddy workmanship. Duggie is critically injured and Richard leaves him to die, opportunistically allowing the incident to remove his unwanted business partner. He panics at first, whipping out his mobile and dialling emergency services. However, he only dials "99" before stopping, then he goes to Duggie's flat to steal the cash Duggie stored there.

In May 2002, Richard's ex-wife, Patricia, inconveniently turns up as Richard finalizes his and Gail's wedding plans. As she was moving to Australia, Patricia wants to cash in her directorship of Kellett Holdings, Richard's property company. Patricia owns 20% of Kellett Holdings, which Richard finally persuades her is worth £25,000. He agrees to hand over the cheque at his Oakhill flats development, where they descend into an argument as Richard stalls on the money due to the cost of underpinning work. In the ensuing confrontation, Patricia falls into the underpinning trench and spits on Richard's face upon vowing to expose him; in response, Richard hits Patricia on the head with a spade - killing her instantly. The next day, her body is covered in tons of cement for the underpinnings. Gail and Richard are married on 28 July 2002.

Upon returning from their honeymoon, Richard learns that his business is going downhill. His attempts to uphold his marriage to Gail are threatened when Patricia's best-friend, Charlotte Morris (Joanne Zorian), visits the street about the circumstances of her disappearance; however, Richard manages to convince her otherwise and Charlotte leaves Weatherfield for good. When he learns that Gail's mother Audrey Roberts (Sue Nicholls) is worth £250,000, he hatches a plan to save his business from being on the verge of financial bankruptcy. Over the next few months, Richard manages to convince Audrey and her family that she has Alzheimer's disease, even getting the doctor to prescribe her medication for sufferers of the condition, and tries to kill her by setting her house on fire. She survives after being pulled out of the blaze by Richard's second business partner, Steve McDonald (Simon Gregson), and later tries to warn Gail; however, already convinced that her mother is indeed senile, she refuses to believe her and the pair end up having a quarrel over Audrey's theory about Richard. Eventually, Gail cuts all ties with Audrey after she and her friend Archie Shuttleworth (Roy Hudd) - who became aware of Richard's agenda when the pair had a previous debate over Patricia's funeral - reported Richard to the police, though they were unsuccessful due to the lack of evidence.

Richard becomes desperate for money and resolves to kill again. He decides to target Audrey's neighbour Emily Bishop (Eileen Derbyshire), whose house he had bought. During a birthday party at The Rovers, where Gail and the others are helping their friend Doreen Heavey (Prunella Gee) celebrate her 50th Birthday, Richard leaves the pub. He then goes to the squat where Sarah's tearaway boyfriend Aiden Critchley (Dean Ashton) is staying and since he drugged him he is able to take and use Critchley's coat and shoes without him waking up. Disguised as Critchley, he enters the house owned by Doreen's daughter Maxine (Tracy Shaw) - where Emily is babysitting. Richard attacks Emily with a crowbar but he is interrupted when Maxine enters the house and confronts him. Richard then kills Maxine by beating her to death with the crowbar and stages a robbery to frame Aiden, who is subsequently charged with murder and attempted murder. Soon afterwards, Richard receives a phone call that a woman who had sold her home to Richard in a buy-back scheme had died a week prior. He is wracked with guilt, realising that the attempt on Emily's life and Maxine's murder had been pointless.

This is further impacted on the day of Maxine's funeral, where Richard ends up delivering a heartfelt speech about Maxine to further cover-up her murder. Upon watching how he visibly appeared, Audrey realises that Richard killed Maxine and desperately tried again to prove her theory - but was dismissed and Richard is later hailed a hero by Maxine's husband Ashley Peacock (Steven Arnold), who thanks him for contributing to his late wife's funeral.

The downfall of Richard ironically begins on the day that his money troubles end. He receives the money from the buy-back scheme and puts a deposit on a new expensive house for the family, after which farewell drinks are arranged for him and Gail. Whilst Richard blissfully looks to the future, drug tests show that Aiden was drugged with the tranquillisers prescribed for Audrey. Sarah visits Aiden in his detention centre where he adamantly tells her that he didn't commit the murder. Audrey tells Gail this who also learns that Richard has lied about several matters connected to his ex-wife's disappearance. She recalls seeing Richard at the cabinet where the tranquillisers were kept on the night of Maxine's murder. Whilst in The Rovers, Richard states to Gail that he does not care about Audrey and Archie's accusations because "he's won" before quickly correcting himself to "we've won" - which proves to be one of his fatal errors. Steve then reveals that he had found a necklace on the building site that Gail was currently wearing, the necklace Richard claimed he bought for her.

After making a farewell speech at everyone's request, Richard spots Gail heading home and follows her. He is stunned when she accuses him of various crimes after finding out that the tranquilizers were in the cupboard before Richard disposed of them. Caught off-guard, Richard confesses to killing Maxine; Gail is shocked, and doesn't buy Richard's excuse when he attempts to put the blame on Aidan for what he did to Sarah. In the ensuing argument between them, Richard finally comes clean about his other crimes to Gail - explaining in full detail how he left Duggie for dead after seeing him fall, and then covering up Patrica's disappearance when he himself murdered her. Realizing that Audrey, Archie, and Norris were all indeed right about Richard all along, Gail describes her husband as "Norman Bates with a briefcase". She then guesses that Richard is sterile and accuses him of not being in love with her, and says that he had merely married her to gain the "ready-made family" that she, David, Sarah and Sarah's daughter, Bethany, provided. Richard is horrified by Gail's words and reluctantly leaves. Gail then tells the police everything, including the location of Patricia's body and they dig it out of the cement - thus confirming Richard as a guilty man.

As Richard goes on the run, becoming the most wanted man in Britain, his crimes are publicly exposed; with Emily finally learning that Norris was right about Richard all along, while Ashley learns that Richard was the one who killed his wife - not Ade. In response to the news, Ashley confronts Gail over Maxine's murder and wishes her dead. In March 2003, Gail's efforts to overcome Richard's antics grow increasingly harder when the police begin investigating her husband's property company - "Kellett Holdings". It soon turns out that Richard's company is non-existent and that he had been defrauding several people, including Jack and Vera. To make matters worse, Gail is under suspicion of collaborating with Richard in his criminal activities when the police confirm that she had been working alongside him in his "company". The situation continues to build for Gail when Jack and Vera later learn that Richard has conned them out of their investment. Although Jack gradually copes with the result, Vera begins harassing Gail and even goes as far as to smash their window when Gail is forced to tell them that she cannot afford to repay the money Richard stole from them. This soon leads to David smashing Vera's window as she continues harassing his mother. When Vera plans to report David to the police after learning about this, David breaks down and explains that Richard is the reason why she lost her money - and is also the reason why Gail is having a difficult time. In response, Vera eventually accepts the result and she later makes amends with Gail.

Gail's troubles seem to have finally ended when she recovers from her trauma and manages to recoup her relationship with both her mother and children. However, Richard soon returns to Weatherfield with a last-ditch familicide intent: he seeks to be with Gail and her children by his side forever by killing them and himself altogether. He is in the house when David returns home, and keeps him silent when David's new friend Craig Harris (Richard Fleeshman) calls through the window. When Sarah returns later with her new boyfriend Todd, she leaves her daughter Bethany on the sofa. After she has seen Todd out, Richard takes them captive. Gail returns home in the evening, and has her hands tied by Richard, however, she manages to smuggle a pair of nail scissors into her hands on the way out of the house. The children are safe, but are bound and gagged in the family's car. While Gail tells them that she loves them, she puts the scissors in Sarah's hands. Originally, Richard intended to gas the family in the garage, until Audrey calls in and disturbs his plans. With the help of Martin and his friends, local mechanic Kevin Webster (Michael Le Vell) and Craig's father Tommy (Thomas Craig), they break down the garage door to see Richard has abducted Gail and her children. Richard then proceeds to drive off with his captive stepfamily.

As Richard flees, Martin pursues him with Kevin and Tommy in another car. The trio catch up to Richard just as his stepfamily free themselves. They try to get Richard to stop the car, which prompts him to drive the car into the canal - though not before he shouts out to Gail and her children that "This is it! I LOVE YOU!". Gail, Bethany, David and Sarah manage to free themselves from the vehicle and are rescued by Tommy and Martin on shore. Tommy then goes back in the water to try and save Richard, but finds that he has escaped from the car. Later on, the police inform Gail that a body has been found at the canal side; she returns there with Audrey, and together they identify the body as Richard's. With her husband dead and all the troubles he inflicted upon both her family and the Weatherfield community over at last, Gail heads home with Audrey after throwing the rings that Richard gave her into the canal. Towards the end of March 2003, Richard's funeral takes place; with Archie carrying out the ceremony and Gail reluctantly attending alone to ensure that her killer husband was laid to rest for good. Shortly afterwards, Gail returned to join the rest of the community in celebrating Maxine's memorial. There, Ashley comforted Gail over her ordeal with Richard and forgave her over his cause in Maxine's death.

Creation and development
Speaking of playing Richard, Capron said: "He’s a wonderful character to play and I’m enjoying every minute of it. I love the fact that Richard has two sides to him, there’s the loving family man and the psychopath. He’s got a real dark side to him, it’s kind of like a psychopathic nature. He comes across as this normal nice guy on the outside but if people knew what he’d done they’d be stunned. In his head I think he seriously believes he loves his family but who knows what goes on in his head."

In January 2002, it was rumored that Coronation Street executive producer Carolyn Reynolds would be axing a number of characters in a bid for the show to beat BBC One soap opera EastEnders in the ratings. Characters that were rumored to be axed were Eileen Grimshaw (Sue Cleaver) and sons Jason Grimshaw (Ryan Thomas) and Todd Grimshaw (Bruno Langley), Dev Alahan (Jimmi Harkishin), Shelley Unwin (Sally Lindsay) as well as Richard. A source commented: "It’s Carolyn ‘Chainsaw’ Reynolds from here on in. There's that much chopping to do that if she used an axe it would take forever. The former producer Brian Park chopped his way through nine characters, but Carolyn is close to knocking off a dozen. It hasn't done much for cast morale. Only last year the top earners had to sign up for pay cuts or face the chop themselves. New "strong" characters will be brought in over the coming months, but the number will be limited in order to keep the wage bill down." These rumors were later proved to be false.

Richard Hillman is renowned as one of the greatest soap villains of all time. Throughout his time on the soap, he turned from a conniving fraudster into a fully-fledged serial killer – becoming known as 'Killman' Hillman by the press. He murdered one Street resident along with his second wife, before attempting to kill several others – including his own wife, two stepchildren, and stepgranddaughter – as well as being partly responsible for the death of Duggie Ferguson. Throughout these storylines ITV used elaborate trailers using the phrase 'Killer Corrie' which later was used to describe other storylines.

Asked how are people reacting to the storyline Brian Capron said in an interview with Digital Spy: "It's great, it really seems to be capturing people's imaginations. Everyone just wants to know what he's going to do next and if he'll kill Gail. I don’t know what the writers have got planned for Richard but he's definitely not finished yet I can promise that. I think he'll be homing in on one or two of the street's best-loved residents. He’s definitely going to get nastier before he gets his comeuppance".

Reception
The character of Richard Hillman proved to be very successful with viewers and critics. On 13 January 2003, an estimated 15.3 million viewers watched the first instalment of Coronation Street with 15.6 million tuning in to watch Richard murder long-standing character Maxine Peacock in the second episode. The two episodes caused a power surge; a National Grid spokesman said: "Obviously, there was a huge audience which meant at the end of the programme people were getting up, turning lights on, going to the toilet, opening fridge doors and boiling kettles. It's that concentrated period when a programme finishes and millions of people around the country go and do something else other than watching Coronation Street."

The double-bill broadcast on 24 February 2003, in which Richard revealed all to Gail attracted an average of 17.2 million viewers for the first instalment, with the second episode averaging 17.6 million. The second episodes peaked at 19.4 million. A spokesperson for Granada Television stated; "The figures are truly staggering. The phones haven't stopped here with fantastic feedback. The whole nation has woken up and is talking about it." 

On 12 March 2003, 19.4 million viewers (62% audience share) tuned in to see Richard drive the Platt family into the canal. The ratings success of the serial killer storyline made Coronation Street the most-watched UK television programme of 2003 beating rival EastEnders into second place.

At the 2003 British Soap Awards, Capron swept the board for his portrayal of Richard, winning for 'Best Actor', 'Best Exit' and 'Villain of the Year'. His confessions episode was voted 'Most Spectacular Scene' and his murders were voted 'Best Storyline'. In a 2003 TVTimes poll, Richard was voted the top soap villain of all time.

See also
List of soap opera villains

References

External links
Corrie.net profile of Hillman

Coronation Street characters
Fictional businesspeople
Fictional serial killers
Fictional kidnappers
Fictional con artists
Fictional criminals in soap operas
Television characters introduced in 2001
Fictional suicides
Male characters in television
Male villains